Maalhos as a place name may refer to:
 Maalhos (Alif Alif Atoll) (Republic of Maldives)
 Maalhos (Baa Atoll) (Republic of Maldives)